XHVJP-FM/XEVJP-AM is a radio station on 92.7 FM and 570 AM  in Xicotepec, Puebla, known as Radio Xicotepec.

History
XEVJP-AM 570 received its concession on July 20, 1988.

XEVJP was cleared to move to FM in 2011, but it was required to maintain its AM station, as communities could lose radio service were the AM station to go off the air.

References

Radio stations in Puebla
Radio stations in Mexico with continuity obligations